Callyspongia siphonella, commonly known as colonial tube-sponge, is a species of sea sponge endemic to the Red Sea. The callyspongia siphonella contains a bioactive compound, Sipholenol A., that has been studied for its anti-proliferative properties in human breast cancer; these properties provide promise in its potential for developing future compounds and thus contributes greatly to future cancer research.

References

Callyspongiidae
Animals described in 1965